"Love Me Like the World Is Ending" is a song performed by Ben Lee and is the first single from his album Ripe. It was the second most added song to Australian radio in its first week. It reached number 18 on the Australian singles chart and was voted number 96 in the Triple J Hottest 100, 2007.

The single featured two other tracks which were also subsequently released on the album Ripe - "Sex Without Love" and "What Would Jay-Z Do?".

This was the first song featured in the TV series Life Unexpected.

Track listing
 "Love Me Like the World Is Ending" – 3:46
 "Sex Without Love" – 3:32
 "What Would Jay-Z Do?" – 2:53
 "Love Me Like the World Is Ending" (acoustic demo version) – 5:06

Charts

References
Ben Lee - Love Me Like The World Is Ending Music Video at KOvideo.net

2007 singles
2007 songs
Ben Lee songs